Richmond Hill City Council is the governing body for the Canadian city of Richmond Hill, Ontario. Council serves a four-year term, after which a new council is elected by qualified electors in Richmond Hill. Richmond Hill City Council consists of a Mayor, six Ward Councillors and two Regional and Local Councillors. The mayor and the regional and local councillors additionally serve on the York Regional Council representing the interests of the residents of Richmond Hill.

The mayor serves as the leader of council, presiding over meetings to maintain order, and calling special meetings when needed. The mayor and councillors both propose, oversee the administration and finances of Richmond Hill and direction the operations of the city's departments, as well as meeting with residents and government agencies to discuss issues relevant to Richmond Hill and its residents.

Current council (2022-2026)

Dave Barrow was elected mayor in 2018 but in September 2021, he announced that he would be leaving the position. Deputy mayor Joe Di Paola served as acting mayor after Barrow's resignation until a by-election could be held to elect a permanent replacement. Ward 4 councillor David West won the by-election held from January 18-24th, 2022 and he was sworn in as mayor the following day. Raika Sheppard was appointed by council to fill the vacancy of West's former seat until November 14, 2022.

Municipal departments 

City Council oversees the municipal departments, which deliver a variety of services to the residents of Richmond Hill. The city has a Community Services Department, Corporate & Financial Services Department, Environment & Infrastructure Services Department, Office of the Chief Administrative Officer and Planning & Regulatory Services Department.

The city’s Corporate & Financial Services Department is responsible for providing direction, policy advice and leadership to and through the Financial Services, Information Technology and City Clerk’s Divisions. It provides expert financial, administrative and technical services to ensure supports are in place for internal and external clients and partners.

The Environment & Infrastructure Services Department oversees the design, construction and overall management of the City’s municipal infrastructure and environmental programs. The Department has a strategic focus on the direction and management of environmental services and initiatives that support future needs and interests of the community. The integration of all design and construction projects for facilities, parks, roads, water, stormwater and wastewater infrastructure resides in this Department.

The Chief Administrative Office provides Corporate leadership in the overall management of the City's five departments. In this role, the Chief Administrative Officer reviews and approves all recommendations made to Council and Committees of Council, and manages corporate strategic planning. The Chief Administrative Officer acts as department head to the Legal Division, Human Resources and the Office of Strategic Initiatives.

The Community Services Department delivers the integrated front line services required to provide for an active, attractive, safe and connected community. The department includes Fire & Emergency Services, Parks Operations, Public Works Operations and Recreation & Culture. The Community Services Department is responsible for delivering Fire & Emergency Services programs, maintaining parks, road repair and replacement, garbage & recycling programs, operation of the City's water & wastewater infrastructure, delivery of recreational & cultural programs and managing the city's recreational facilities. The department also runs special events, such as Concerts in the Park and The Reel Thing, a local film festival.

The Community Services Department also runs the Richmond Hill Centre for the Performing Arts.

The Planning & Regulatory Services Department provides Planning and Building related services to Council, other departments and the general public. Each division within the department has responsibility for various stages and aspects of land development and construction of buildings, as well as the administration of various City by-laws. It responds to the specific needs of Council, the public and the development industry.

History 
Richmond Hill was incorporated as a village in 1873, and the village council consisted of a reeve and four village councillors. The councillors were the top four vote-getters of all persons running for the job. The reeve and councillors served one-year terms. Richmond Hill was incorporated as a town in 1957, and the town council was expanded to include a mayor, a reeve, a deputy reeve and four town councillors. In 1966, the council began to serve two-year terms, rather than the previous one-year terms. In 1982, the terms of councillors were extended to three years, and in 2006 the terms were extended to four years. In March 2019, Richmond Hill was designated a city.

Deputy Mayor
 Vito Spatafora - 2006-2018
 Carmine Perrelli - 2018-2021 (Title stripped by council in Sept 2021)
 Joe DiPaola - 2018-2022 (Sole Deputy Mayor from Sept 2021 - Nov 2022, served as Acting Mayor from February 2021 to January 2022 during Dave Barrow's leave of absence and eventual resignation until David West was elected in the Jan 2022 by-election) 
 Godwin Chan - 2022-Present

Notes

References 

Municipal councils in Ontario
Politics of Richmond Hill, Ontario